A.O. Kymi is a Greek football club, based in Kymi, Euboea.

The club was founded in 1957. They will play for 2nd season in Football League 2 for the season 2014–15.

Football clubs in Central Greece
Sports clubs in Euboea